Plesiopelma paganoi is a tarantula in the Plesiopelma genus, this tarantula was first described by Nelson Ferretti and Jorge Barneche in 2014. It is named in honor of Luis G. Pagano, Argentinean ornithologist who helped to collect this species. It is found in Argentina, in the Salta province, next to the south Bolivia border.

Description 
Plesiopelma paganoi differs from most of the Plesiopelma genus, except from P. insulare, by the high number of labial and maxillary cuspules  and absence of spiniform hairs on the retrolateral face of cymbium. It differs from it because the shape of the palpal bulb, which is a slender shape, shorter with a strongly curved embolus. Its carapace and legs are dorsally black with whitish hairs on carapace border, and the abdomen is dorsally black with reddish setae.

Habitat 
Plesiopelma paganoi was found only in the Yungas eco-region in high cloud forest areas. A juvenile was found at the piedmont jungle in the tiny crevices underneath decomposing logs a microhabitat shared with specimens of a species of Acanthoscurria. Another juvenile was found between shrubs next to a dry river and a path.

References 

Theraphosidae
Spiders of South America
Animals described in 2014
Arthropods of Argentina